VA115 or VA-115 may refer to:
Attack Squadron 115 (U.S. Navy)
Rotorschmiede VA115, a German helicopter design
State Route 115 (Virginia)